Driesch is a surname. Notable people with the surname include:

 Angela von den Driesch (1934–2012), German archaeologist and veterinarian
 Hans Driesch (1867–1941), German biologist and philosopher
 Johannes Driesch (1901–1930), German painter, graphic artist, ceramicist, and book cover designer